Her Imaginary Lover is a 1933 British comedy film directed by George King and starring Laura La Plante and Percy Marmont. It was produced and distributed by Warner Brothers and shot at the company's Teddington Studios as a quota quickie.

The film was a quota quickie production based on the play Green Stockings by A. E. W. Mason, featuring La Plante as New York socialite Celia who invents an aristocratic English fiancé named Lord Michael Ware to deflect the tedious attention of would-be suitors.  Celia travels to London to claim an inheritance...and meets an aristocratic Englishman called Lord Michael Ware (Marmont).  The imaginary romance becomes real.  Her Imaginary Lover is classed by the British Film Institute as a lost film.

Cast
 Laura La Plante as Celia
 Percy Marmont as Lord Michael Ware
 Bernard Nedell as Davidson
 Olive Blakeney as Polly
 Roland Culver as Raleigh Raleigh
 Lady Tree as Grandma
 Emily Fitzroy as Aunt Lydia

References

Bibliography
 Chibnall, Steve. Quota Quickies: The Birth of the British 'B' Film. British Film Institute, 2007.
 Low, Rachael. Filmmaking in 1930s Britain. George Allen & Unwin, 1985.
 Wood, Linda. British Films, 1927-1939. British Film Institute, 1986.

External links
 
 Her Imaginary Lover at BFI Film & TV Database

1933 films
1933 comedy films
British comedy films
Films directed by George King
British black-and-white films
Lost British films
British films based on plays
1930s English-language films
1930s British films
Warner Bros. films
Quota quickies
Films shot at Teddington Studios